32 Battalion: The Inside Story of South Africa's Elite Fighting Unit is a book written by Piet Nortje. For his entire adult life he had been a soldier. Half of his military career he spent with 32 Battalion. During early 1993 he volunteered to compile the story of 32 Battalion. He was inspired to do this during informal discussions with two former 32 Battalion officers, Commandant Werner Sott, outgoing OC 7 SA Infantry Battalion, and his successor, Commandant Daan van der Merwe. They informed Nortje that someone else already approached to do so, but even though Nortje was advised to drop the idea, he started to collect as much information as possible on 32 Battalion.

At the end of 1993 a staff paper written by Major Walley Vrey, entitled The History of 32 Battalion, was supplied to Nortje. Upon the retrieval of this document, he was again advised that there was another book in the pipeline, but he ignored this warning once again. By January 1998 no other book had been published about 32 Battalion's history, even though various people promised Nortje that there were other books being written. He started to fear that some vital information and facts would start to die away with time. He turned to Brigadier General Eddie Viljoen who immediately offered him assistance. Viljoen told Nortje how to proceed with this project, which Nortje appreciated very much, as Viljoen was the longest serving officer with 32 Battalion.

The main roadblock for Nortje was that all the information regarding 32 Battalion was still classified, and without official records the book wouldn't be as accurate and complete as possible. Because he was a serving member of the South African National Defence Force, he had to obtain special permission from the Chief of the South African Army before he could get access to these archives. The information was spread over 2319 files, all stamped Top Secret at the Department of Defence Documentation Centre in Pretoria. These documents were declassified between November 1999 an April 2002, revealing the truth behind what happened in Angola.

During the same period Nortje sent 1309 email messages to former members of the 32 leader group. He asked them for personal opinions, recollections, photographs and anecdotes. He even ran a website for six months to account for the experiences of those who served with 32 Battalion. The response Nortje got was disappointing. Only seven people returned emails to him. Due to this, he decided to only include the official records and his own experiences. The chapter headings of this book are very special. These are the names of songs traditionally sung by 32 Battalion, translated into English. These songs were sung on the eve of battle or on the parade ground.

People who made a contribution to this book:

 Walley Vrey
 Steve de Algera
 Rene Geyer
 Johannes 'Groenie' Groenewald
 Eddie Viljoen
 Fires van Vuuren
 Sam Heap
 IG van Rooyen
 Mark Craig
 Nelson Fishback
 Marlene Burger

See also
 List of operations of the South African Border War

References

External links
 32 Battalion - A Book by Piet Norje
 32 Battalion: The Inside Story of ... - Google Book Search
 32 Battalion, Books Author: Piet Nortje, - kalahari.net
 32 Battalion, Book: Striking inside Angola with 32  Battalion, 2012, Author: Marius Scheepers

2004 books